Craig Stephen Sutherland (born 17 December 1988) is a Scottish former professional footballer who played as a forward. He began his career in the United States playing college soccer for Midwestern State University and North Carolina State University. Sutherland played 16 times in the Football League for Blackpool and Plymouth Argyle between 2011 and 2012. He has also played for Woking, Queen's Park, Cowdenbeath, Stenhousemuir and East Fife.

Career
Sutherland played for Spartans at youth level between 2006 and 2007 before moving to the United States to begin a soccer scholarship in Texas.

Sutherland joined Blackpool on 26 July 2011 from North Carolina State University. He made his debut on 5 August as a substitute in Blackpool's single-goal Championship victory at Hull City in the opening game of the 2011–12 Football League season. His first start came six days later, in the first round of the League Cup against Sheffield Wednesday at Hillsborough.

On 16 November he joined League Two side Plymouth Argyle on loan for two months, joining teammate Paul Bignot, who had also signed on loan two weeks earlier. His made his debut three days later in a 3–1 defeat away to Torquay United.

He went close to scoring his first senior goal in his third appearance for the Pilgrims, in a 1–1 draw with Bradford City at Valley Parade on 10 December. A shot from Simon Walton took a deflection in the crowded penalty area and Sutherland was credited with the goal by the Press Association, however the deflection actually came off a Bradford defender. "Craig said he didn't touch it. It might have been one of the defenders, but, as far as I understand it, it's only an own goal if it is not on target, and it was going in," said Walton. "Craig said, while we were celebrating, 'It's your goal' so I'll take it." The goal remained credited to Sutherland at the end of the season.

Sutherland returned to Blackpool at the end of January 2012, having made nine appearances for Argyle. He was released at the end of the 2012–13 season without making another first team appearance.

Sutherland then spent time on trial at Rangers before signing for Woking. In March 2014, Sutherland went on trial at Dundee. After registration issues stopped him joining Dundee, he signed for Scottish League Two club Queen's Park until the end of the 2013–14 season.

On 25 July 2014, Sutherland signed for Scottish Championship club Cowdenbeath.

On 23 January 2015, Sutherland joined Stenhousemuir, signing a contract until the end of the 2014–15 season. He was released by the club at the end of the season.

Sutherland then signed for East Fife on 23 July 2015, making eight appearances before leaving the club in October 2015.

Personal life
Sutherland was born in Edinburgh. After attending George Watson's College in Edinburgh, he moved to the United States in 2007 to begin a soccer scholarship at Midwestern State University. He played for Great Britain in the 2009 Summer Universiade football tournament, held in Serbia. In the opening group game he scored a late equaliser in a 2–2 draw with Mexico at the Omladinski Stadium, Belgrade. After two years at Midwestern he then moved to North Carolina State University, where he played for a further two years.

Career statistics

References

External links

Craig Sutherland profile at North Carolina State Wolfpack's website

1988 births
Living people
Footballers from Edinburgh
Scottish footballers
Association football forwards
Midwestern State Mustangs men's soccer players
NC State Wolfpack men's soccer players
Blackpool F.C. players
Plymouth Argyle F.C. players
Woking F.C. players
Queen's Park F.C. players
Cowdenbeath F.C. players
Stenhousemuir F.C. players
East Fife F.C. players
English Football League players
Scottish Professional Football League players
Midwestern State University alumni
North Carolina State University alumni
People educated at George Watson's College